Vallcarca is a Barcelona Metro station in the Vallcarca i els Penitents neighbourhood, in the Gràcia district of Barcelona.The station is served by line L3.

The station opened in 1985 when the section of line L3 between Lesseps and Montbau stations was inaugurated.

The station is located underneath Avinguda de Vallcarca (formerly known as the Avinguda de l'Hospital Militar), between Carrer de l'Argentera and the Vallcarca bridge. It has three entrances and can be accessed from either side of Avinguda de Vallcarca, as well as from Avinguda de la República Argentina.

See also
List of Barcelona Metro stations

References

External links

Trenscat.com
Transportebcn.es

Barcelona Metro line 3 stations
Railway stations in Spain opened in 1985
Transport in Gràcia